Zaranie Śląskie (Polish for "Dawn of Silesia") was a Polish quarterly literary magazine devoted to the culture and history of Silesia. It was founded in 1907 by Ernest Farnik and published in Cieszyn.

It focused on the region of Cieszyn Silesia, however since the 1930s gradually left this area of interest and focused more on Upper Silesia. Zaranie Śląskie published historical and folkloristic articles, literary works, folk songs etc. Many well-known regional writers and activists contributed to the magazine, e.g. Ludwik Brożek, Emanuel Grim, Andrzej Hławiczka, Paweł Kubisz, Jan Łysek, Antoni Macoszek, Julian Przyboś, Oskar Zawisza and others.

The publishing of the magazine was resumed after World War II. It was published in Katowice in 1945-1948 and later from 1957. At this stage of its history it hadn't too much common with the region of Cieszyn Silesia. Zaranie Śląskie ceased to exist in 1992.

Footnotes

References

External links
 Zaranie Śląskie at Digital Silesian Library 

1907 establishments in Austria-Hungary
1992 disestablishments in Poland
Cieszyn Silesia
Defunct literary magazines published in Poland
Magazines established in 1907
Magazines disestablished in 1992
Mass media in Cieszyn
Polish-language magazines
Quarterly magazines